Lowell is a populated place situated in Cochise County, Arizona, United States. It was incorporated into Bisbee in the early 1900s.

Originally a residential town, it was later settled by many miners from countries such as Finland, Serbia and Montenegro working in Lavender Pit located there.

References

External links
 Lowell – ghosttowns.com

Populated places in Cochise County, Arizona
Ghost towns in Arizona